Benjamin "Ben" Henrickson is a character on the HBO series Big Love. He is portrayed by Douglas Smith.  Ben is the second child and oldest son of Bill Henrickson with his first and once legal wife, Barbara Henrickson. As of "The Lost Boys", he is 17 years old. He becomes a priesthood holder in season 2.

Biography
Like most teenagers, Ben is full of raging hormones, which he struggles to control in keeping with the views on sexuality in his religion; he desires to be chaste but finds little support for this desire among his friends or from his older girlfriend, Brynn.  Ben and Brynn were steadily dating, but she felt that the Mormon views on chastity and sexuality amounted to brainwashing and saw no reason to reserve sexual relations for marriage. This led to conflict between her and Ben until she eventually made it known to him that she would have nothing to do with him unless he would be willing to sleep with her. After struggling for a few weeks without her, Ben came to Brynn's house and acceded to her demand, initiating a sexual relationship that eventually becomes public to the entire Henrickson clan. He proposes marriage to her, both to satisfy his own conscience and to render their relationship acceptable; when his parents refuse to accept the union, he says that if his marriage to Brynn doesn't work out, he can take on a second wife. This disturbs Barb, who doesn't want to see Ben become a polygamist, and she invites Brynn over, telling her the advantages and disadvantages of a polygamous relationship. Brynn, who was not told about Ben's plans of taking more wives after her, breaks up with Ben. Afterward, Bill, happy about his son's interest in polygamy, anoints him priesthood holder.

He is very close to his father's young third wife Margene Heffman. Ben is especially close to Margene because of their closeness in age, which makes her more of an older sister than a mother to him. Telling him that she wishes she had waited for marriage and had known, as he does, that sex is "a sacred thing," she encourages him in his struggle to remain pure rather than only castigating him when he fails. Recently, however, it is implied that the friendship may have turned into a one-sided crush. His mother Barb worries how close the two are after she finds out Ben prefers sleeping on Margene's couch rather than his own bedroom. Later, Ben meets Margene's ex-boyfriend and he makes several lewd comments about her, Ben violently pushes him to the ground, and some days later, angrily confronts Margene about her previous sexual exploits. It is revealed that while Bill may be comfortable with Margene's previous relationships, Ben isn't, possibly due both to his own unresolved pangs of conscience over his continuing relationship with Brynn and to his own romantic feelings for Margene.

After it becomes clear that Barb wants to discourage Ben from polygamy, he starts dating twin girls from the compound in season two to the annoyance of his older sister who, like their mother, is concerned that Ben may one day end up like his father, a polygamist.
In season four Margene kisses him, causing Ben and Bill to mutually agree to leave at this time. However, it seems by the end of the season he has reconciled with his father and is allowed back in the House.

In season 5 he begins an unexpected romance with Heather Tuttle. Though they break up and reunite on at least two occasions, a flash forward in the series finale reveals that they eventually marry.

Henrickson, Ben
Television characters introduced in 2006